is a Japanese footballer currently playing as a midfielder for Tochigi SC.

Career statistics

Club
.

Notes

References

External links

1999 births
Living people
Sportspeople from Akita Prefecture
Association football people from Akita Prefecture
Japanese footballers
Association football midfielders
J2 League players
Blaublitz Akita players
FC Ryukyu players
Arterivo Wakayama players